The Hong Kong Senior Shield 2005–06, also known as the 2005/2006 HKFA Senior Shield, is the 104th staging of the Hong Kong's oldest football knockout competition.

The competition started on 4 March 2006 with 8 Hong Kong First Division League clubs and concluded on 18 March 2006 with the final.

Kitchee captured their 5th title of the competition after beating Happy Valley by 3-0 in the final.

Fixtures and results

Bracket

Quarterfinals

Semi-finals

Final

Top goalscorers
 4 goals
  Keith Gumbs of Kitchee

 2 goals
  Lico of Xiangxue Sun Hei
  Kwok Yue Hung of Kitchee
  Clodoaldo de Oliveira of Happy Valley

 1 goal
  Stephen Joseph Musah of Dongguan Lanwa
  André of Xiangxue Sun Hei
  Ivan Jević of Kitchee
  Fábio Lopes Alcântara of Happy Valley
  Evanor of Happy Valley

Prizes

Teamwise
 Champion: Kitchee (HK$80,000)
 First Runners-up: Happy Valley (HK$20,000)
 Knock-out in the Semi-Finals: Dongguan Lanwa and Xiangxue Sun Hei (HK$10,000 each)
 Knock-out in the Preliminary: Buler Rangers, Citizen, Hong Kong 08 and South China (HK$5,000 each)

Individual Awards
 Top Scorer Award:  Keith Gumbs of Kitchee
 Best Defender Award:  Ivan Jević of Kitchee
''Each player received a prize of HK$5,000.

Trivia
 The pre-match of the Senior Shield final was All Hong Kong Schools Jing Ying Football Tournament final between Yan Chai Hospital Tung Chi Ying Memorial Secondary School and Beacon College. Tung Chi Ying captured the champion by winning 5-1.

See also
 HKFA Website 2005/2006 HKFA Senior Shield
 www.rsssf.com Hong Kong 2005/06

References

2006 domestic association football cups
Shield
2005-06